Jasper Township is an inactive township in Dallas County, in the U.S. state of Missouri.

Jasper Township was organized in 1841, taking its name from William Jasper, a soldier and casualty in the American Revolutionary War.

References

Townships in Missouri
Townships in Dallas County, Missouri